The 2015 season marked the 108th season in which the Richmond Football Club participated in the AFL/VFL.

2014 off-season list changes

Retirements and delistings

Free agency

National draft

Rookie draft

2015 squad

2015 season

Pre-season 

Source:AFL

Home and away season 

Source: AFL Tables

Finals 

Source: AFL Tables

Ladder

Awards

League awards

All-Australian team

Rising Star
Nominations:

22 Under 22 team

Brownlow Medal tally

Club awards

Jack Dyer Medal

Michael Roach Medal

Reserves
For the second consecutive season, the Richmond Football club ran a stand-alone reserves team in the Victorian Football League (VFL). 
Richmond senior and rookie-listed players who were not selected to play in the AFL side were eligible to play for the team alongside a small squad of VFL-only listed players. 
The team finished 13th out of 15 participating clubs, with a record of five wins and thirteen losses. Each of the club's nine home matches were played at the Punt Road Oval.
Senior listed player Matt Dea won the Guanane Medal as the VFL side's best and fairest, while another senior listed player Liam McBean was awarded the Jim 'Frosty' Miller Medal for the league's leading goalkicker.

References

External links 
 Richmond Tigers Official AFL Site
 Official Site of the Australian Football League

Richmond Football Club seasons
Richmond Tigers